Where I Should Be is the sixth studio album by Peter Frampton, released in 1979.

Background
Released in 1979, the album went gold and produced the hit "I Can't Stand It No More", which reached #14 on the Billboard pop charts.

Track listing

Personnel 
The line-up on this album was varied and did not consist solely of the previous Frampton band.
Peter Frampton - guitars, keyboards, vocals
Steve Cropper - guitar
Bob Mayo - keyboards
Eddie N. Watkins, Jr. - bass
Stanley Sheldon - bass
Donald Dunn - bass
Tower of Power - horn section
Gary Mallaber - drums
Jamie Oldaker - drums
Steve Forman - percussion

Charts 
Album

Single

References

Peter Frampton albums
1979 albums
A&M Records albums
Albums produced by Peter Frampton